William Moore Wallis Clark (10 January 1897 – 1 May 1971) was an Ulster Unionist member of the Senate of Northern Ireland from 1946 until 1961. He was Deputy Leader of the Senate and Parliamentary Secretary in the Department of the Prime Minister from 1948 to 1960.

References

1897 births
1971 deaths
Ulster Unionist Party members of the Senate of Northern Ireland
Members of the Senate of Northern Ireland 1945–1949
Members of the Senate of Northern Ireland 1949–1953
Members of the Senate of Northern Ireland 1953–1957
Members of the Senate of Northern Ireland 1957–1961
Northern Ireland junior government ministers (Parliament of Northern Ireland)